This is a list of schools which once operated in Northland, New Zealand, but no longer exist. The list is not comprehensive for schools closed before 1999.

Far North District

Whangarei District

Kaipara District

References

Northland
 
Northland
New Zea